The Honda CBF250 is a standard motorcycle, part of the CBF series produced by Honda. It is powered by a  naturally aspirated carburetor single-cylinder engine.

External links 

Honda CBF250 review

Cbf250
Standard motorcycles